Huxleyia is a genus of bivalves belonging to the family Nucinellidae.

The genus has almost cosmopolitan distribution.

Species
Species:

Huxleyia cavernicola 
Huxleyia concentrica 
Huxleyia diabolica 
Huxleyia habooba 
Huxleyia maxima 
Huxleyia munita 
Huxleyia pentadonta 
Huxleyia sulcata

References

Nucinellidae
Bivalve genera